The boys' 100 metre freestyle event at the 2018 Summer Youth Olympics took place on 11 and 12 October at the Natatorium in Buenos Aires, Argentina.

Results

Heats
The heats were started on 11 October at 10:48.

Semifinals
The semifinals were started on 11 October at 18:22.

Final
The final was held on 12 October at 18:24.

References

Swimming at the 2018 Summer Youth Olympics